The 1900 Tie Cup Final was the final match to decide the winner of the Tie Cup, the 1st. edition of the international competition organised by the Argentine and Uruguayan Associations together. The final was contested by two Argentine sides, Belgrano A.C. and Rosario A.C., from Buenos Aires and Rosario respectively.

The match was held in the Flores Old Ground in Caballito, Buenos Aires, on 25 August 1900. Belgrano won 2–0 with goals by F. Wiberley and Winston Coe, achieving its first Tie Cup trophy.

Qualified teams

Overview 
The first edition of the Tie Cup was contested by 6 teams, 4 from Argentina and 2 from Uruguay. Playing in a single-elimination tournament, Belgrano defeated Lomas (4–2 in Quilmes AC), and Albion in the semifinal (1–0 at Paso del Molino, Montevideo).

On the other hand, Rosario only played one match, qualifying for the final after beating English High School 3–1 at Plaza Jewell.

The final was played at the Flores Old Ground in Buenos Aires. In an very even game, Belgrano took advantage when Wibberley scored on 20'. After the goal, there were many attempts from Belgrano's players to score a second goal, but goalkeeper Herbert D. Dorming saved Rosario's goal in each one of them. Where there were only 2' left in the first half, Belgrano scored its second goal by forward Winston Coe.

Match details

References

1900 in Argentine football
Football in Buenos Aires
T
t